Mary Shakespear may refer to:

Dorothy Shakespear, also known as Mary, English artist
Mary Shakespeare, mother of William Shakespeare